The Hyundai County (hangul:현대 카운티) is a single-decker minibus manufactured by the truck & bus division of Hyundai. It was introduced in 1998 as a successor to the Chorus. It is primarily available as city buses and tourist buses.

It is related to the now-discontinued Kia Combi.

Models
Hyundai County & e-County are designed by Hyundai Motor Company Jeonju Design Center. The County was built between 1998 and 2004, a new variant e-County was built since 2004.

First facelift held in 2008. Minor change model was revealed in 2012 Busan Motor show.

EV spec called 'County Electric' was revealed in 2019 Hyundai Truck & Bus Business Fair with Hyundai Pavise. And facelifted version launched in May 2020 as 'County New Breeze'. Its design was based on a Chinese specification which was revealed in 2015 Auto Shanghai.

Model name (South Korea)
Gold
Tour (Rent A Car Bus)
Super
Deluxe
Standard

Lineup & body types

County standard body: 15-25 passengers
County long body: 20-30 passengers
County extra long body: 26-34 passengers

Engine

See also

Hyundai Motor Company
Hyundai Chorus
 List of buses

References

External links
Hyundai County E-Catalog

Rear-wheel-drive vehicles
Minibuses
Hyundai buses
Vehicles introduced in 1998